Screaming Blue Murder is the third studio album by British heavy metal band, Girlschool. It was released on Bronze Records in 1982, and featured one line-up change in bassist Ghislaine 'Gil' Weston, formerly of The Killjoys, replacing the recently departed founding member Enid Williams. Nigel Gray, who had previously worked with The Police, produced the album.

The original vinyl issue had the lyrics printed on the inner sleeve, although in the UK initial copies were accidentally shipped with a plain, generic liner. Rock magazine Kerrang! relayed, from Bronze Records, the advice to write to the label so that they could post the missing lyric sheet in return.

The UK-release was somewhat delayed, and the band had already started their 20-date UK tour, which ran through May 1982.

Castle Music issued what is considered the definitive edition of the CD 14 June 2004, adding eleven bonus tracks and extensive sleevenotes by Record Collector magazine's Joe Geesin. The album had previously been issued on a 2-on-1 CD in the UK, coupled with Play Dirty; that release (LOMA CD4) featured no bonus material.

Track listing 

Tracks 12-21 are a BBC Radio 1 In Concert broadcast, recorded live in London on June 9th, 1982. These tracks had previously not been made commercially available.

Credits 
Band members
 Kim McAuliffe – rhythm guitar, lead vocals on tracks 1, 2, 3, 5, 6, 8
 Kelly Johnson – lead guitar, lead vocals on tracks 1, 4, 6, 9
 Enid Williams – bass, lead vocals on track 11
 Gil Weston – bass, lead vocals on tracks 7, 10
 Denise Dufort – drums

Production
Nigel Gray – producer, engineer

Charts

References

External links 
 Official Girlschool discography

Girlschool albums
1982 albums
Bronze Records albums
Mercury Records albums
Albums produced by Nigel Gray